Panama's Centennial Bridge is a major bridge crossing the Panama Canal. It was built to supplement the overcrowded Bridge of the Americas and to replace it as the carrier of the Pan-American Highway. Upon its opening in 2004, it became the second permanent crossing of the canal.

Description 

The Centennial Bridge is the second major road crossing of the Panama Canal, the first being the Bridge of the Americas. (Small service bridges are built in the lock structures at Miraflores and Gatún Locks, but these bridges are only usable when the lock gates are closed and have limited capacity.)

New freeway sections, connecting Arraijan in the west to Cerro Patacon in the east via the bridge, significantly alleviate congestion on the Bridge of the Americas.

History 

The Bridge of the Americas, which opened in 1962, was the only major road crossing of the Panama Canal. The traffic over this bridge was originally around 9,500 vehicles per day; however, this expanded over time, and by 2004 the bridge was carrying 35,000 vehicles per day.

Since the bridge represented a major bottleneck in the Pan-American Highway, Panama's Ministry of Public Works requested tenders for a second canal crossing in October 2000. The contract to build a replacement bridge was awarded in March 2002. An ambitious schedule of just 29 months was set for construction, so that the bridge could open on the 90th anniversary of the first ship transit of the Panama Canal by the cargo ship Ancon, on 15 August 1914. The bridge was named for Panama's centennial, which occurred on 3 November 2003. similar to Russky Bridge in Russia,

The new bridge was designed by a joint venture between T.Y. Lin International and the Louis Berger Group Inc, and constructed by German-based Bilfinger Berger Ingenieurbau GmbH using resources from its Australian subsidiary Baulderstone Hornibrook. The architects were Elle Sokolow working as an Architect for Geiger-Berger Associates and the Boston-based transportation architect Miguel Rosales from Rosales + Partners who created the concept and initial aesthetic designs for the Panama-Centennial Bridge. Structural engineering contracts were awarded to Leonhardt, Andrä and Partner.

The bridge was inaugurated on schedule on 15 August 2004, although it was opened for traffic on 2 September 2005, when the new highways leading to it were finished.

Part of the access to the Centennial Bridge collapsed in December 2010, following heavy rain and flooding. In November 2011 full traffic was restored.

Construction 

The deck carries six lanes of traffic across the canal.

The Centennial Bridge is designed to withstand the earthquakes which are frequently recorded in the canal area. It was built by the German construction firm Bilfinger.

The West Tower was built about 50 m inland to allow space for the future widening of the Panama Canal.

Awards 

 2005 Bridge Award of Excellence, American Segmental Bridge Institute (ASBI).
 2007 Merit Award, Consulting Engineers and Land Surveyors of California (CELSOC)

Gallery

See also

 List of bridges in Panama

References

External links 

 Panama Canal Authority - Photos of the Centennial Bridge 
 Panama Canal Authority - Live webcam at Centennial Bridge
 

Panama Canal
Cable-stayed bridges in Panama
Bridges completed in 2004
2004 establishments in Panama